Richard Brodhead (January 5, 1811September 16, 1863) was an American lawyer and politician from Easton, Pennsylvania. He represented Pennsylvania in both the U.S. House (1843 to 1849) and Senate (1851 to 1857).

He was the father of U.S. Representative Jefferson Davis Brodhead, who also represented Pennsylvania.

Biography

Richard Brodhead was born in Lehman Township, Pennsylvania, the son of Hannah (Drake) and Richard Brodhead, Sr.  Brodhead moved to Easton, Pennsylvania in 1830. He studied law, was admitted to the bar in 1836 and commenced practice in Easton.  He was a member of the Pennsylvania State House of Representatives from 1837 to 1839. He was appointed treasurer of Northampton County, Pennsylvania in 1841.  His wife was Mary Jane Davis Bradford, a niece of Jefferson Davis of Mississippi.

Political career
Brodhead was elected as a Democrat to the Twenty-eighth, Twenty-ninth, and Thirtieth Congresses.  He served as chairman of the United States House Committee on Revolutionary Pensions during the Twenty-ninth Congress.  He was not a candidate for renomination in 1848.

Brodhead was elected as a Democrat to the United States Senate.  He served as chairman of the United States Senate Committee on Claims during the Thirty-second and Thirty-third Congresses. and the United States Senate Committee on Revolutionary Claims during Thirty-second Congress.  He died in Easton in 1863.  Interment in Easton Cemetery.

Legacy
He was the most recent resident of the Lehigh Valley area to serve as United States Senator from Pennsylvania until the election of incumbent Pat Toomey in 2010.

References

Commemorative Biographical Record of Northeastern Pennsylvania, including the Counties of Susquehanna, Wayne, Pike and Monroe (Chicago: J. H. Beers, 1900), 80–1; Papers of Jefferson Davis 1:520-1; 1:279, n20.

External links

The Political Graveyard
 

1811 births
1863 deaths
Democratic Party members of the Pennsylvania House of Representatives
Pennsylvania lawyers
Democratic Party members of the United States House of Representatives from Pennsylvania
Politicians from Easton, Pennsylvania
Democratic Party United States senators from Pennsylvania
19th-century American politicians
19th-century American lawyers